Khaled Lemmouchia (born December 6, 1981) is a former professional footballer. He played primarily as a defensive midfielder.

Born in France, Lemmouchia is a former Algerian youth international having played briefly for the under-20 team during the qualification process for the 2001 African Youth Championship. In February 2008, Lemmouchia was called up to the senior team for the first time  for a training camp held in Paris. and would go on to make his debut on 31 May 2008 in a 2010 FIFA World Cup qualifying match against Senegal. He featured for Algeria at the 2010 Africa Cup of Nations and the 2011 African Championship of Nations. As of August 2012, he has won 22 international caps.

Club career
Born in Givors, Rhône, Lemmouchia started his career at the age of 16 when he joined the Olympique Lyonnais academy, despite receiving interest from almost every club in France. He worked his way into the reserve squad. However, when his amateur contract expired he was not offered a professional deal and signed with amateur-club AS Moulins. A year later, he would join another amateur side, this time AS Lyon Duchère where he would spend the next 4 seasons. In the summer of 2006, he quit AS Lyon Duchère and signed his first professional contract with Algerian side ES Setif.

After joining ES Setif, Lemmouchia quickly became an important team member. In his first season, he led the team to the league title as well as the Arab Champions League title.

On July 29, 2011, Lemmouchia signed a one-year contract with USM Alger. He made 27 appearances, scoring 1 goal, helping the club to a third-place finish in the 2011–12 Algerian Ligue Professionnelle 1 and a spot in the 2013 CAF Confederation Cup.

On August 13, 2012, Lemmouchia traveled to Tunis to negotiate a contract with Tunisian side Club Africain. On August 22, he signed a one-year contract with the club.

International career
Whilst Lemmouchia was a youth player for Olympique Lyon he was called up by the France Under-17, but Lemmouchia rejected the call-up and opted to play for his country of origin Algeria instead. Lemmouchia was called up to play for the Algerian Under-20 squad in 2000 for the 2001 African Youth Championship qualifiers. Lemmouchia played his first under-20 game against Libya in Algiers which they won 1–0. In his second and final game for the under-20's, the team was required to win the game otherwise their hopes of qualifying would be over. The team managed a 2–2 draw in the second leg of the game against Ghana, which ended their hopes of qualifying for the 2001 African Youth Championship, that was to be hosted in Ethiopia.

On 6 February 2008, Lemmouchia was called up by Saâdane to a training camp held in Paris, France in preparation for the upcoming FIFA World Cup 2010 qualifiers. Lemmouchia began his senior international career for Algeria away on 31 May 2008 as a starter against Senegal in the first game of the FIFA World Cup 2010 qualifiers.

Lemmouchia was one of the players that were injured during an attack by Egyptians on the coach that was carrying the Algerian team; he stated that he felt disappointed that the game went ahead as the players feared more attacks.

Career statistics

Honours

Club

ES Sétif
 Algerian Championnat National: 2006–07, 2008–09, runner-up 2009–10
 Arab Champions League: 2006–07, 2007–08
 North African Cup of Champions: 2009
 Algerian Cup: 2009–10
 North African Super Cup: 2010
 North African Cup Winners Cup: 2010
 CAF Confederation Cup runner-up: 2009

References

External links
 
 
 DZFoot Profile

1981 births
Living people
People from Givors
Sportspeople from Lyon Metropolis
French sportspeople of Algerian descent
Association football midfielders
Algerian footballers
Algeria international footballers
2010 Africa Cup of Nations players
2013 Africa Cup of Nations players
Olympique Lyonnais players
ES Sétif players
MC Oran players
USM Alger players
Lyon La Duchère players
Algerian Ligue Professionnelle 1 players
Algeria A' international footballers
2011 African Nations Championship players
Algeria youth international footballers
Club Africain players
Expatriate footballers in Tunisia
Algerian expatriate sportspeople in Tunisia
Algerian expatriate footballers
Footballers from Auvergne-Rhône-Alpes
French footballers